Jeff Grayson may refer to:

 Jeffrey Grayson (1942–2009), American businessman and criminal
 Jeff Grayson (sportscaster), sportscaster for Fox Sports Wisconsin